Jean François Cornu de La Poype (31 May 1758 – 27 January 1851) was a French military leader.  He was born in Lyon, to a noble, military family.

French Revolutionary Wars 

Under the ancien regime he joined the army at a young age and received the rank of brigadier before the French Revolution in 1789. He was named a major general on 15 May 1793. A Revolutionary partisan, he married the daughter of famous convention member Louis-Marie Stanislas Fréron. He distinguished himself at Siege of Toulon. He contributed strongly to the retaking of the fortified town; he then directed the attack on Fort Pharon, then is charged by Committee of public safety to contain Marseilles and the South of France under the regime of the Terror. Lapoype was not associated with the thermidor reaction, in which his  brother-in-law was one of agitators. He remained without employment under the Directory and served in Italy after 18 brumaire.

Consulate and Napoleonic wars 
Sent to Santo Domingo in 1802, he deployed as much capacity there as of courage, made a treaty with Jean-Jacques Dessalines and embarked for France in 1803, and was captured en route by the English, who imprisoned him at Portsmouth. He was exchanged with another prisoner for British prisoners held by the French, and was unemployed until 1813. He was then named to command Wittenberg on the Elbe which Napoleon refortifies. La Poype is distinguished in the conflict there in 1814 when it was stormed by the Prussian Army under General Bogislav Friedrich Emanuel von Tauentzien. La Poype fought with an elite unit, against forces ten times bigger and against a rebellion of the inhabitants. He took measures to escape the city rather than to yield. He left Wittenberg with weapons in hand, i.e. did not have to give them up after the suspension of hostilities. He was awarded the order of Saint-Louis and the command of Agen.

Hundred Days 
In 1815, Napoleon named him commander of Lille. He forced the city to recognise the imperial revival, in spite of the exasperation of its inhabitants, who were strongly in favour of Bourbons. To respond to the threat of insurrection, he placed two cannons charged with grapeshot at the door of the house where he was staying,; but it was the general headquarters he wanted to protect, and not his own person; and to prove it, one saw him walking without escort and hands behind his back on the streets of Lille.

Restoration 
At the Bourbon Restoration, he was put into retirement. Named member of Chambre des deputes in 1822, he voted consistently with the extreme left. In 1824, he was imprisoned for several months for writing a political booklet. He died at Brosses.

French generals
French Republican military leaders of the French Revolutionary Wars
French commanders of the Napoleonic Wars
Military personnel from Lyon
1758 births
1851 deaths
Order of Saint Louis recipients
Names inscribed under the Arc de Triomphe